Alexander Hamilton (Scottish, born 1950) is an artist, publisher and series editor for Studies in Photography books (Art and Visual Culture), distributed by Edinburgh University Press. He is the Chair of the Scottish Society for the History of Photography. As an artist, his chosen medium is cyanotype. He has exhibited widely within the UK, Europe and the USA and his work is held at the National Science and Media Museum. A monograph of his life and work, In Search of the Blue Flower: Alexander Hamilton and the Art of Cyanotype, will be published in 2022.

Life

Alexander Hamilton grew up in the Midlands, England and moved to Caithness, Scotland in 1962. He began studying Drawing and Painting at Edinburgh College of Art (ECA) in 1968, and in 1970, as a gallery assistant during Strategy Get Arts, he came under the influence of the participating artists. Following graduation from ECA in 1972, he spent six months recording plants on the uninhabited island of Stroma in Caithness. This began his 50-year journey of creating unique plant-based cyanotypes.

Work

Alexander Hamilton’s artworks offer a visual response to environmental and ecological concerns. The focus of his work is plant life and his relationship to it. He has explored environmental issues ranging from airborne pollution to plant pathology and phenology. 

Throughout his career, he has pursued a program of exhibitions, public art projects and residencies, including large-scale sculptures and multi-screen installations, all developing on and perfecting his cyanotype practice.

Selected Exhibitions 

2016 - Votaries of the Blue Flower – University of Edinburgh – Jane McKie and Alexander Hamilton
 2016 - Blueprints  - Gallery Ten
2015 - Dignified Spaces – New South Glasgow Hospital
2013 - Blueprint: Photography and Engineering - Glasgow Print Studio and Street Level Photoworks
2013 - Between the Sun and the Moon - Leyden Gallery
2011 - Stromata: Touring exhibition – Highland Council
2010 - On the Edge of the World - British Council – Edinburgh
2009 - Trace – Galeria Muzalewska
2009 - Sensorium: Pictures from Nature's Laboratory - Lancaster University
2008 - Blue Flora Celtica – Kinloch Rannoch, Fingal's Cave and Foksal Gallery, Poland 
2008 - The Glenfinlas Cyanotypes – Edinburgh Art Festival
2007 - Evanescence, Vaavatnet, Norway
2007 - Contact Rushes - Scottish National Portrait Gallery and Fabryka Sztuki, Lodz
2005 - A Landscape Symphony in 22 Movements - Threshold Artspace
2002 - The Great Divide - Fruitmarket Gallery, Edinburgh and Hohenheim University, Stuttgart
1995 - Four Flowers Cyanotypes- Fotofeis touring exhibition
1995 - Shadows in the Water- Fotofeis touring exhibition

Collections and Commissions
National Science and Media Museum
Foksal Gallery Collection in MoMA Warsaw Collection, Poland
Seed Chamber, Greenmarket Dundee (2000)
Glass Panel, Dunbeath Heritage Centre (2001)

Journal Articles
Winter 2017, Interview by Jane Mackie in Studies in Photography
2020, "Plants as effective bioindicators of urban air pollution," Leaves 
2020, "Goethe and Ruskin talking about plants," Leaves

References 

Scottish artists
1950 births

Living people